ŠHK 37 Piešťany was a professional Slovak ice hockey club, based in Piešťany, Slovakia. The club was founded in 1937. The team is nicknamed Havrani ("ravens").

Honours

Domestic

Slovak 1. Liga
  Winners (2): 2009–10, 2010–11
  Runners-up (2): 2008–09, 2011–12

Slovak 2. Liga
  Winners (1): 2002–03

References

External links
 Official club website

Piešťany
Ice hockey clubs established in 1937
1937 establishments in Slovakia